The Five Obstructions is a 2003 Danish documentary film directed by Lars von Trier and Jørgen Leth. The film is conceived as a documentary, but incorporates lengthy sections of experimental films produced by the filmmakers. The premise is that von Trier has created a challenge for his friend and mentor, Jørgen Leth, another renowned filmmaker. Lars von Trier's favorite film is Leth's The Perfect Human, and von Trier gives Leth the task of remaking The Perfect Human five times, each time with a different "obstruction" (or obstacle) imposed by von Trier.

It has been said that "Both this film and Dogville show a more mature von Trier, one who is more aware of and accountable to the full implications of the torture, suffering and victimization he has employed in his films, especially in exploring how easily those who victimize others in the name of righteousness become victims [of] their own self-righteousness."

The obstructions

Leth must remake the film in Cuba, with no set, and with no shot lasting longer than twelve frames, and he must answer the questions posed in the original film; Leth successfully completes this task.
Leth must remake the film in the worst place in the world but not show that place onscreen; additionally, Leth must himself play the role of "the man". The meal must be included, but the woman is not to be included. Leth remakes the film in the red light district of Mumbai, only partially hiding it behind a translucent screen.
Because Leth failed to complete the second task perfectly, von Trier punishes him, telling him to either remake the film in any way he chooses, or else to repeat it again with the second obstruction in Mumbai. Leth chooses the first option and remakes the film in Brussels, using split-screen effects.
Leth must remake the film as a cartoon. He does so with the aid of Bob Sabiston, a specialist in rotoscoping, who creates animated versions of shots from the previous films. As such the final product is technically an animation but not a cartoon. Nevertheless, von Trier considers the task to be completed successfully.
The fifth obstruction is that von Trier has already made the fifth version, but it must be credited as Leth's, and Leth must read a voice-over narration, ostensibly from his own perspective but in fact one written by von Trier.

Collaboration with Martin Scorsese
In 2010 Variety reported rumors that Lars von Trier, Martin Scorsese, and Robert De Niro planned to work on a remake of Scorsese's film Taxi Driver with the film made with same restrictions as were used in The Five Obstructions. In 2014 Paul Schrader, the screenwriter for Taxi Driver said that it was not being made. He said, "It was a terrible idea" and "in Marty's mind, it never was something that should be done."

Reception
The Five Obstructions received strongly positive reviews from critics. It holds a 79/100 on Metacritic, and Rotten Tomatoes reports 88% approval among 59 critics. It was later voted one of the 30 best films of the 2000s in a poll for Sight & Sound.

References

Further reading
Hjort, Mette. The Five Obstructions. In

External links

Movies You May Have Missed – Episode 18: "We Challenge You to Watch The Five Obstructions" (9 September 2009)

2000s avant-garde and experimental films
2003 documentary films
2003 drama films
2003 films
2000s business films
Danish avant-garde and experimental films
Danish documentary films
Danish drama films
2000s Danish-language films
Documentary films about actors
Documentary films about animation
Documentary films about Cuba
Documentary films about film directors and producers
Documentary films about films
Documentary films about food and drink
Documentary films about women in film
Documentary films about women in India
Films about cities
Documentary films about prostitution in India
Films directed by Jørgen Leth
Films directed by Lars von Trier
Films set in Brussels
Films set in Denmark
Films set in Mumbai
Films shot in Brussels
Films shot in Cuba
Films shot in Denmark
Films shot in Mumbai
2000s French-language films
2000s Spanish-language films
2000s English-language films
2003 multilingual films
Danish multilingual films